Thornbury Hill is a hill in Hagworthingham, Lincolnshire, England.

Hills of Lincolnshire